In Cold Blood is the third album of The Legendary Tigerman, released in 2004

Track listing 
 In Cold Blood - Azembla's Remix (3:01)
 Love Train - Bullet Torch Mix (4:40)
 Crawdad Hole - X-Wife Remix
 Your Life Is A Lie - Wip's Breakbeat Version
 Keep'em Dogs On It - Le Petit Prince "Drugs On It" Version
 Fuck Christmas I Got The Blues - Stealing Orchestra Mix
 L.T.M. Mix - By Mars
 Love Train - Volstad Mix
  Your Life Is A Lie - Electrical Remix By Plaza

References 

2004 albums
The Legendary Tigerman albums